Onke Jiba is a South African rugby union player for the  in the Currie Cup. His regular position is wing.

Jiba was named in the  side for the 2022 Currie Cup Premier Division.

References

South African rugby union players
Living people
Rugby union wings
Sharks (Currie Cup) players
Year of birth missing (living people)